Daniel Allcock is a mathematician specializing in group theory, Lie theory and algebraic geometry. He is a professor of mathematics at the University of Texas at Austin.

Career
Allcock graduated from the University of Texas in 1991 with a double major in mathematics and physics. He received his Ph.D. from the University of California, Berkeley in 1996 under the supervision of Richard Borcherds and Andrew Casson. After temporary positions at the University of Utah and Harvard University, he returned to the University of Texas as a faculty member in 2002.

Awards
In 2012, Allcock became a fellow of the American Mathematical Society.

References

Year of birth missing (living people)
Living people
Fellows of the American Mathematical Society
20th-century American mathematicians
21st-century American mathematicians
University of Texas at Austin College of Natural Sciences alumni
University of California, Berkeley alumni
University of Texas at Austin faculty
Group theorists
Algebraic geometers
University of Utah faculty
Harvard University faculty